Florence Wyle  (November 14, 1881 – January 14, 1968) was an American-Canadian sculptor, designer and poet; a pioneer of the Canadian art scene. She practiced chiefly in Toronto, living and working with her partner Frances Loring, with whom she shared a studio and home for almost sixty years. In 1928, she co-founded and was a former president of the Sculptors' Society of Canada with Loring, Alfred Laliberté, Elizabeth Wyn Wood, Emanuel Hahn and Henri Hébert, and was the first woman sculptor to become a full member of the Royal Canadian Academy of Arts. Throughout her career, alongside Loring, she was a persistent and convincing advocate for policy, tax benefits and living wages for artist's work.

Biography

Wyle was born in Trenton, Illinois and in 1900 enrolled at the University of Illinois as a pre-med student where anatomy classes awakened in her a wonder and reverence for human anatomy.  Three years later (1903) she transferred to the School of the Art Institute of Chicago where she began studying clay modeling with Lorado Taft. She studied modelling and sculptural design in the USA under Frances Loring.

Wyle moved to Toronto in 1913 to join Loring who had moved there the year before. Wyle worked as a sculptor in clay, plasticine, stone and wood until her death in 1968. Most of her carvings were executed by herself. One of her early works, Sun Worshipper (1916) is a bronze female nude "basking in the rays" and arching her body in a way that "hints more than a little at sexual pleasures."

Wyle was a member of the Ontario Society of Artists (1920–1933, then from 1948), the Sculptors Society of Canada (1933), the Royal Canadian Academy of Arts (associate 1920, full member 1938) and the Canadian Guild of Potters.

Career and official commissions
Wyle preferred architectural projects that were large in scale compared to her partner Frances Loring. She was made a member of the Royal Canadian Academy of Arts. Her work was often exhibited by the Women's Art Association of Canada. Small figurines in wood which were part of the Dominion Drama Festival trophy set were among her commissions the year she was 80. The Ontario Veterinary College has one of her pieces, a bas-relief panel 13' high depicting farm animal. The late Pearl McCarthy, art critic for the Globe and Mail, once said that large or small, cats or heroes, the sculpture of Frances Wyle had a lyrical as well as classical quality.

1926 – St. Stephen War Memorial
1957 – Mother and Children, Canadian National Exhibition

Posthumous honour
In 2000 the Canadian Portrait Academy made Wyle an Honorary Academician naming her one of the Top 100 Artists of the 20th Century.

Publications

References

External links

 Florence Wyle archival papers  at the Art Gallery of Ontario research library and archives

1881 births
1968 deaths
Canadian women sculptors
Canadian women poets
American emigrants to Canada
Canadian designers
Members of the Royal Canadian Academy of Arts
20th-century Canadian sculptors
20th-century Canadian poets
20th-century Canadian women artists
20th-century Canadian women writers
Lesbian sculptors
Lesbian poets
Canadian lesbian artists
American lesbian artists
Canadian LGBT sculptors
American LGBT sculptors
Canadian LGBT poets
American LGBT poets
20th-century American sculptors
20th-century American poets
20th-century American women artists
20th-century American women writers
Persons of National Historic Significance (Canada)
American women sculptors
American women poets
Artists from Illinois
LGBT people from Illinois
19th-century American LGBT people
20th-century American LGBT people
19th-century Canadian LGBT people
20th-century Canadian LGBT people